Alan Fogarty is an Irish water polo player. He was a member of the Irish Water Polo Association's Senior Men's International Team but is currently retired from International Water Polo. He still plays For the Senior Division 1 team at Sandycove Swimming and Water Polo club in Dublin.

References

Irish male water polo players
Living people
Year of birth missing (living people)
Place of birth missing (living people)